Feng-hsiung Hsu (born January 1, 1959) (nicknamed Crazy Bird) is a Taiwanese-American computer scientist and the author of the book Behind Deep Blue: Building the Computer that Defeated the World Chess Champion. His work led to the creation of the Deep Thought chess computer, which led to the first chess playing computer to defeat grandmasters in tournament play and the first to achieve a certified grandmaster-level rating.

Hsu was the architect and the principal designer of the IBM Deep Blue chess computer. He was the recipient of the 1990 Mephisto Best-Publication Award for his doctoral dissertation and also the 1991 ACM Grace Murray Hopper Award for his contributions in architecture and algorithms for chess machines.

Career
Hsu was born in Keelung, Taiwan, and came to the United States after graduating from National Taiwan University with a BS in E.E. He started his graduate work at Carnegie Mellon University in the field of computer chess in the year 1985.  In 1988 he was part of the "Deep Thought" team that won the Fredkin Intermediate Prize for Deep Thought's grandmaster-level performance.  In 1989 he joined IBM to design a chess-playing computer and received a Ph.D. in computer science with honors from Carnegie Mellon University. 

In 1991, the Association for Computing Machinery awarded Hsu a Grace Murray Hopper Award for his work on Deep Blue.  In 1996, the supercomputer lost to world chess champion Garry Kasparov. After the loss, Hsu's team prepared for a re-match.  During the re-match with Kasparov, the supercomputer had double the processing power it had during the previous match. On May 11, 1997, Kasparov lost the sixth and final game, and, with it, the match (2½–3½).

Prior to building the supercomputer Deep Blue that defeated Kasparov, Hsu worked on many other chess computers. He started with ChipTest, a simple chess-playing chip, based on a design from Unix-inventor Ken Thompson's Belle, and very different from the other chess-playing computer being developed at Carnegie Mellon, HiTech, which was developed by Hans Berliner and included 64 different chess chips for the move generator instead of the one in Hsu's series. Hsu went on to build the successively better chess-playing computers Deep Thought, Deep Thought II, and Deep Blue Prototype.

In 2003, Hsu joined Microsoft Research Asia, in Beijing. In 2007, he stated the view that brute-force computation has eclipsed humans in chess, and it could soon do the same in the ancient Asian game of Go. This came to pass nine years later in 2016.

Bibliography
Behind Deep Blue: Building the Computer that Defeated the World Chess Champion. Princeton University Press, 2002.. Review by ChessBase.com

See also
 Arimaa
 Deep Blue versus Garry Kasparov
 Deep Blue - Kasparov, 1996, Game 1
 Deep Blue - Kasparov, 1997, Game 6
Game Over: Kasparov and the Machine
 ChipTest, the first in the line of chess computers co-developed by Feng-hsiung Hsu
 Deep Thought, the second in the line of chess computers co-developed by Feng-hsiung Hsu
 Deep Blue, another chess computer co-developed by Feng-hsiung Hsu, being the first computer to win a chess match against the world champion
 List of pioneers in computer science

Notes

External links
Feng-hsiung Hsu at IBM
Oral History of Feng-Hsiung Hsu. Interviewed by: Dag Spicer. Recorded: February 14, 2005, at Computer History Museum, Mountain View, California
Feng-hsiung Hsu's papers at DBLP
Chess, China, and Education: A Ubiquity Interview with F-H Hsu

Living people
American computer scientists
American Go players
Go (game) writers
Carnegie Mellon University alumni
Computer chess people
Grace Murray Hopper Award laureates
National Taiwan University alumni
Scientists from Keelung
Taiwanese emigrants to the United States
1959 births